Julius Ertlthaler (born 25 April 1997) is an Austrian professional footballer who plays as a midfielder for Austrian Bundesliga club WSG Tirol.

Club career
On 13 August 2020, he signed with TSV Hartberg.

On 2 February 2022, Ertlthaler signed a 2.5-year contract with WSG Tirol.

References

1997 births
Living people
Austrian footballers
Austria under-21 international footballers
Association football midfielders
SV Mattersburg players
TSV Hartberg players
WSG Tirol players
Austrian Regionalliga players
Austrian Football Bundesliga players